Ben Rosenfield  is an American actor and musician, best known for playing Willie Thompson on the fourth and fifth seasons of HBO's period crime drama series Boardwalk Empire (2013–2014). His first role was in the Off-Broadway stage adaptation of the Ingmar Bergman film Through a Glass Darkly. He has starred as Tim Buckley  in the bio-pic Greetings from Tim Buckley.  Rosenfield played Henry Ellis in the musical drama Song One (2014), starred as Fisher Miller in the teen drama Affluenza (2014), (2015), and Bertram Flusser in the period drama Indignation. In 2016 Ben starred as Dan Mercer the romantic drama 6 Years.  In 2017, he portrayed Sam Colby in the third season of Twin Peaks. In 2017 Rosenfield also starred in the dramatic comedy Person to Person. He played Aron Church in 2019 film Mickey and the Bear. In 2019 Rosenfield also appeared in the Netflix documentary series The Family. In 2020 he was cast opposite Cate Blanchett in the limited series Mrs. America.

Early life
Rosenfield was raised in Montclair, New Jersey. His father, Stephen Rosenfield, is a teacher of stand-up comedy and the founder of the American Comedy Institute in New York City. His mother,  Kate Redway Rosenfield, is an actress and teaches improv. Rosenfield has one younger brother, Nate. He is Jewish, and has said that he "used to be rather religious" despite his family's atheism. His ancestors were from Ukraine, Romania, Denmark, and Scotland.

Rosenfield attended Glenfield Middle School where, in eighth grade, he portrayed Tevye in a production of Fiddler on the Roof. He then attended and graduated from Montclair High School in 2010.

Career
In 2011, Rosenfield made his stage debut in the Off-Broadway production of the play Through a Glass Darkly, alongside Carey Mulligan and Chris Sarandon. In August of the same year, it was announced that Rosenfield had been cast to co-star as Tim Buckley in the drama film Greetings from Tim Buckley (2012). The film also featured Penn Badgley and Imogen Poots in main roles. The following year, he starred as Tommie Scheel in the documentary film Teenage, and joined the cast of Boardwalk Empire in the recurring role of Willie Thompson, Eli's (Shea Whigham) son. For the fifth and final season, he was promoted to a series regular. Rosenfield then co-starred in the films Jamesy Boy (2014) and Song One (2014), before having his first leading role in the film Affluenza (2014), which also starred Grant Gustin and Nicola Peltz. Also in 2014, Rosenfield appeared in a supporting role in the crime drama A Most Violent Year, opposite Jessica Chastain and Oscar Isaac.

In January 2015, Rosenfield was cast as Woodnut in Jennifer Haley's play The Nether with the MCC Theater, which ran from February 4 to March 15, 2015 at the Lucille Lortel Theatre. Rosenfield then portrayed Dan Mercer in Hannah Fidell's relationship drama film 6 Years, starring opposite Taissa Farmiga. The film had its world premiere at South by Southwest on March 14, 2015, and was released on Netflix on August 18, 2015.

He next had a supporting role in Woody Allen's comedy-drama Irrational Man, co-starring Joaquin Phoenix and Emma Stone. The film premiered at the 2015 Cannes Film Festival and was released in theaters on July 17, 2015. Rosenfield then co-starred as Bertram Flusser (alongside Logan Lerman) in the drama film Indignation, an adaptation of Philip Roth's 2008 novel of the same name, which premiered at the 2016 Sundance Film Festival on January 24, 2016 and was released to theaters on July 29, 2016. Also in 2016, he starred alongside Richard Armitage and Zoe Kazan in the Off-Broadway play Love, Love, Love, from the Roundabout Theatre Company. Rosenfield is part of the ensemble cast of the drama film Person to Person, which premiered at the 2017 Sundance Film Festival. He was also cast as Sam Colby in the Showtime series revival of David Lynch's Twin Peaks.

In 2017, Rosenfield portrayed Alex Holmes in the Off-Broadway premiere of the Simon Stephens play On the Shore of the Wide World. He was also seen in the comedy film The Long Dumb Road, re-teaming with director Hannah Fidell.

In 2019, Ben played the role of Aron Church, in the film Mickey and the Bear directed by Annabelle Attanasio. The film premiered at the SXSW Film Festival where it was acquired for theatrical distribution by Utopia. The film went on to play to rave reviews at the 2019 Cannes film festival.

In 2020, Rosenfield starred opposite Cate Blanchett in the recurring role of John Schlafly, in the FX limited series Mrs. America. Mrs. America was nominated for 10 Emmy Awards including Outstanding Limited Series.
.
In February 2020  it was announced that Rosenfield had been cast in the Lead role of Mark in Hannah Marks upcoming 
feature film Mark, Mary & Some Other People.

Music

In December 2014, Rosenfield released an EP titled Field on Bandcamp and began playing shows at clubs around NYC. In February 2017, he released a full-length album titled dum die on Bandcamp. The song "Angel in the Sky" on Rosenfield's album was used in the score of the film Mickey and the Bear. Rosenfield recorded several songs with Jenny Lewis for the soundtrack to the film Song One''.

Filmography

Film

Television

Stage

Awards and nominations

References

External links

 

1992 births
21st-century American male actors
American male film actors
American male television actors
American male stage actors
Jewish American male actors
Living people
Male actors from New Jersey
Montclair High School (New Jersey) alumni
People from Montclair, New Jersey
21st-century American Jews